The San Diego School of Creative and Performing Arts, known as SDSCPA, is an audition-only public arts magnet school in southeastern San Diego, California, US. The San Diego SCPA is a non-tuition, public, dedicated magnet school in the San Diego Unified School District serving families throughout San Diego County.  The San Diego SCPA provides pre-professional training in the arts alongside a college preparatory curriculum. All students audition and complete a required series of specialized arts training in Theater, Music, Dance, Visual and Cinematic Arts,  or Creative Writing. Upon graduation, most SDSCPA students continue to universities or conservatories for further study in the arts and academics. Recent acceptances include the Juilliard School, Cornish,  Art Institute of Chicago, Curtis, New England Conservatory, Oberlin Conservatory, Manhattan School of Music, Boston Conservatory, Peabody Institute, and CalArts.

Enrollment

Middle school
Middle school applicants must complete the San Diego Unified School District Open Enrollment application and then contact artistic director, Richard Trujillo, to set up an audition. Auditions usually take place in the Fall. Acceptance is via audition only.

High school
All students must first complete the San Diego Unified School District Open Enrollment Application. Prospective high school students must audition for a specific program in one of five majors: Creative Writing, Dance, Dramatic Arts, Music, and Visual and Media Arts. Students may audition and be accepted into several programs, but must choose which one they will pursue while at SDSCPA. Each program has its own audition panel.

Productions

Mainstages

Each spring the San Diego School of Creative and Performing Arts releases their upcoming performance season. Shows are typically staged in one of two main locations - the Florence Johnson Grand Theater or the Ole Kittleson Little Theater.

Arts

Music
Students can choose from four main forms of music: Band, Jazz, Orchestra, and Voice. The advanced musical groups go on annual tours to compete against other schools from around the nation. These tours can be to places as close as Anaheim and Las Vegas, or as far as Boston and Hawaii. The most notable tour was in 2016 to New York City, featuring the school's Jazz Band at the Jazz at Lincoln Center Competition.

Dance
Several dance classes are available. These classes, ranging from beginning to advanced levels, are not limited to only one or two types of dance. Classes include Theater Dance, Ballet, Modern, and jazz tap.

A professional strand dance class is two periods long. These are meant for more serious dancers who want to get the best of their training.

Visual and Cinematic Arts
Students in the Visual and Cinematic Arts programs take courses in photography, drawing and painting, video production, and yearbook.

In 2015, the SDSCPA opened a new multimillion dollar film studio, launching the Cinematic Arts program.

Theatre
Students majoring in Theatre complete courses in Acting, Musical Theatre, or Technical Theatre.

Creative Writing
Students majoring in Creative Writing take courses in Creative Writing and Journalism. Students may also elect to take courses in Broadcast Journalism.

Notable students
 Andra Day, Golden Globe Winner and singer
 Hans Fjellestad, filmmaker and musician
 Jane Granby, artist 
 Christian Hoff, 2006 Tony Award winner 
 Ananda Lewis, television personality 
 James Maslow, actor
 Sara Ramirez, Tony Award-winning actress 
 Giovonnie Samuels, actress
 Brian Justin Crum, singer
 Salem Mitchell, model
 Lou Romano, animator and voice actor
 Mallori Johnson, actress
 Charl Brown, Broadway Actor, Tony Award Nominee
 Jeremy McQueen, dancer
 Jeffrey Gerodias, dancer
 Kimberly King , television personality
 Jeffrey Gerodias, dancer
 Brad Bradley, Broadway Actor
 Shondra Profit, Broadway Actor

See also
Primary and secondary schools in San Diego, California

References

External links
Official SCPA website

Magnet schools in California
Public middle schools in California
Schools of the performing arts in the United States
High schools in San Diego
Public high schools in California
Educational institutions established in 1978
1978 establishments in California